Setrak Avetovich Akopyan (born 8 November 1999) is a Russian football player of Armenian descent. He plays as a left-back for FC SKA Rostov-on-Don.

Club career
He made his debut in the Russian Football National League for FC Luch Vladivostok on 7 April 2019 in a game against FC Chertanovo Moscow.

References

External links
 
 Profile by Russian Football National League
 

1999 births
Sportspeople from Vladivostok
Russian people of Armenian descent
Living people
Russian footballers
Association football midfielders
FC Luch Vladivostok players
FC Urozhay Krasnodar players
FC SKA Rostov-on-Don players
Russian First League players
Russian Second League players